Qi Yuanjing (4 April 1929 – 4 November 1994) was a Chinese engineer who was  from 1985 to 1993.

He was an alternate member of the 12th Central Committee of the Chinese Communist Party and a member of the 13th and 14th Central Committee of the Chinese Communist Party. He was a member of the Standing Committee of the 8th National People's Congress.

Biography
Qi was born in Hankou (now Wuhan), Hubei, on 4 April 1929. His elder sister  and brother-in-law  were both Communist politicians. At the beginning of 1938, he came to Yan'an with his elder sister, where he graduated from Yan'an Academy of Natural Sciences (now Beijing Institute of Technology). He joined the Chinese Communist Party (CCP) in November 1945. He enrolled at Harbin Institute of Technology in 1948 and then Dalian University of Technology in 1950. In 1951, he was sent to study at Leningrad Institute of Architectural Engineering on government scholarships.

Qi returned to China in 1956 and was assigned to the General Institute of Ferrous Metallurgy Design,  (now Beijing Central Engineering and Research Incorporation of Iron and Steel Industry), where he successively served as engineer, deputy section chief, leader of the engineering design team, deputy party secretary of the institute, senior engineer, vice president, and president. In September 1985, he was promoted again to become . In June 1991, he was diagnosed with stomach cancer. In 1993, he took office as vice chairperson of the National People's Congress Environment Protection and Resources Conservation Committee.

On 4 November 1994, he died of stomach cancer in Beijing, at the age of 65.

Honours and awards
 1994 Member of the Chinese Academy of Engineering (CAE)

References

1929 births
1994 deaths
People from Wuhan
Engineers from Hubei
Beijing Institute of Technology alumni
Harbin Institute of Technology alumni
Dalian University of Technology alumni
Members of the Chinese Academy of Engineering
Alternate members of the 12th Central Committee of the Chinese Communist Party
Members of the 13th Central Committee of the Chinese Communist Party
Members of the 14th Central Committee of the Chinese Communist Party
Members of the Standing Committee of the 8th National People's Congress